Gerald Dwight "Wings" Hauser (born December 12, 1947) is an American actor and occasional director. He received an Independent Spirit Award nomination for his supporting role in Tough Guys Don't Dance (1987).

Life and career
Hauser was born in Hollywood, California, the son of Geraldine (née Thienes) and director and producer Dwight Hauser (1911–1969). His brother is actor Erich Hauser. In 1967, Hauser landed his first  acting role as a marine rifleman in the World War II-drama First to Fight.

In 1975, Hauser released an album for RCA entitled Your Love Keeps Me Off the Streets. For this LP, he used the name Wings Livinryte. Hauser first attracted notice in 1977 in The Young and the Restless as Greg Foster. He starred in the 1982 made-for-TV-movie Hear No Evil as Garrard. Hauser appeared in forty-one television series, including recurring roles in Beverly Hills 90210, Murder, She Wrote, and Roseanne, and a cameo as a juror in the season 4 episode "Mr. Monk Gets Jury Duty" of Monk.

In 1983, a story he wrote became the Paramount box-office hit Uncommon Valor. Hauser appeared in the 1982 movie Vice Squad as the pimp "Ramrod," and performed the song "Neon Slime" for the opening and closing credits.  He appeared in Deadly Force, No Safe Haven, Tough Guys Don't Dance, and the French movie Rubber, directed by French musician Quentin Dupieux.

Personal life 
Hauser has a daughter, Bright Hauser, from his first marriage to Jane Boltinhouse. From his second marriage to Cass Warner Sperling, daughter of Milton Sperling, he has a son, actor Cole Hauser. Wings Hauser is married to actress Cali Hauser. The Melbourne Underground Film Festival held a retrospective with his films in 2009.

Filmography

Film

 1967 First to Fight as Ragan (uncredited)
 1978 Who'll Stop the Rain as Marine Driver
 1982 Vice Squad as 'Ramrod'
 1982 Homework as 'Reddog'
 1982 Hear No Evil as Garrard
 1983 Ghost Dancing as Frank Carswell
 1983 Deadly Force as 'Stoney' Cooper
 1984 Mutant as Josh Cameron
 1984 A Soldier's Story as Lieutenant Byrd
 1984 Sweet Revenge as Major Frank Hollins
 1984 Terror in the Aisles as 'Ramrod' (in 'Vice Squad') (archive footage) (uncredited)
 1985 Command 5 as Jack Coburn
 1985 The Long Hot Summer as Wilson Mahood
 1986 Dark Horse as Unknown
 1986 3:15 as Mr. Havilland (uncredited)
 1986 Jo Jo Dancer, Your Life Is Calling as Cliff
 1986 The Wind as Phil
 1986 Hostage as Major Sam Striker
 1986 Raw Terror as Unknown
 1987 Tough Guys Don't Dance as Captain Alvin Luther Regency
 1987 No Safe Haven as Clete Harris
 1988 Dead Man Walking as John Luger
 1988 Death Street USA (a.k.a. Nightmare at Noon) as Ken Griffiths
 1988 The Carpenter as Carpenter
 1989 The Siege of Firebase Gloria as Corporal Joseph L. DiNardo
 1989 L.A. Bounty as Cavanaugh
 1989 Bedroom Eyes II as Harry Ross
 1990 Reason to Die as Elliot Canner
 1990 Marked for Murder as Emerson
 1990 Coldfire as Lars
 1990 Street Asylum as Arliss Ryder
 1990 Out of Sight, Out of Mind as Victor Lundgren
 1990 Wilding as Tim Parsons
 1990 Pale Blood as Van Vandameer
 1990 Living to Die as Nick Carpenter
 1991 Bump in the Night as Patrick Tierney
 1991 Frame Up as Ralph Baker
 1991 The Killers Edge (a.k.a. Blood Money) as Jack
 1991 Beastmaster 2: Through the Portal of Time as Arklon
 1991 The Art of Dying as Jack
 1991 In Between as Jack Maxwell
 1992 Frame Up II: The Cover-Up (a.k.a. Deadly Conspiracy) as Sheriff Ralph Baker
 1992 Mind, Body & Soul as John Stockton
 1992 Exiled in America as Fred Jenkins
 1993 Champagne and Bullets as Huck Finney
 1994 Watchers 3 as Ferguson
 1994 Skins (a.k.a. Gang Boys) as Joe Joiner
 1995 Victim of Desire as Leland Duvall
 1995 Tales from the Hood as Officer Strom
 1995 Broken Bars as Warden Pitt
 1995 Guns & Lipstick as Michael
 1996 Original Gangstas as Michael Casey
 1999 Life Among the Cannibals as Vince
 1999 The Insider as Tobacco Lawyer
 1999 Clean and Narrow as Sheriff Brand
 2001 Savage Season as Maddox
 2002 The Blue Lizard as 'Little G'
 2004 Irish Eyes (a.k.a. Vendetta: No Conscience, No Mercy) as Kevin Kilpatrick
 2004 The Running as Not Hasselhoff
 2006 Mystery Woman: Wild West Mystery as Strother Elam
 2007 Avenging Angel as Colonel Cusack
 2007 The Stone Angel as Older Bram
 2010 Rubber as Man In Wheelchair

Television episodes
 1975 Cannon “A Touch of Venom” as Ethan Morse (Credited as Wings Livinryte)
 1981-2010 The Young and The Restless as Greg Foster
 1981 Magnum, P.I. - "Wave Goodbye" as Nick Frangakis 
1983 The Fall Guy - "Just a Small Circle of Friends" as Baba
 1984 Hunter - "Dead or Alive" as Jimmy Jo Walker
 1985 Airwolf - "Airwolf II" as Harlan Jenkins
 1985 The A-Team - "Blood, Sweat, and Cheers", "The Big Squeeze" as Karl Ludwig / Jack 'The Ripper' Lane
 1985-1996 Murder, She Wrote - "Reflections of the Mind", "Night Fear", "Love & Hate in Cabot Cove", "Track of a Soldier" as Howard Levering / Sam Bennett / Wallace Evans / Carl
 1986 The Last Precinct as Lieutenant Hobbs
 1987 Perry Mason - "The Case of the Scandalous Scoundrel" as Captain James Rivers
 1988-1991  China Beach as Lt. Col. Mac Miller
1992 Lightning Force as LT. Col Matthew 'Trane' Coltrane
 1992-1993 Roseanne as Ty Tilden, Neighbor 
 1993 Space Rangers - "Fort Hope" as Ex-Ranger Decker
 1994 Walker, Texas Ranger - "Right Man, Wrong Time" as Wayland Hampton
 1994-1996 Beverly Hills 90210 as J. Jay Jones
 1995 Kung Fu: The Legend Continues - "Brotherhood of the Bell" as Damon
 1996 JAG - "Sightings" as J.D. Gold
 2003 Kingpin as Doug Duffy
 2005 House - "Hunting" as Michael Ryan
 2007 Bones - "The Man in the Mud" (2007) as Lenny Fitz
 2009 The Mentalist - "Paint It Red" as A.P. Caid
 2010 Criminal Minds - "Exit Wounds" as Sheriff Rhodes

References

Citations

Sources

External links

Wings Hauser (Aveleyman)

1947 births
Male actors from Los Angeles
American male film actors
American male soap opera actors
American male television actors
20th-century American male actors
21st-century American male actors
Living people
Warner family